Oliana is a municipality in the comarca of the Alt Urgell in 
Catalonia, Spain. It is situated in the Segre valley immediately below the Oliana reservoir.
There is a factory of domestic electrical appliances in the town, and the presence of non-farming employment has meant that 
Oliana has escaped the depopulation experienced by most municipalities in north-west Catalonia. It is 
currently the second-largest town (by population) in the Alt Urgell, behind the comarcal capital La Seu d'Urgell. The 
town is served by the C-14 road between Ponts and La Seu d'Urgell.

Demography

Subdivisions 
The municipality of Oliana includes two outlying villages. Populations are given as of 2001:
Les Anoves (27)
El Castell (73)

Climbing
The region is well-known among rock climbers for its extremely difficult limestone cliffs, including La Dura Dura ("the hardest of the hard"), which is one of the hardest climbs successfully undertaken in the world.

References

 Panareda Clopés, Josep Maria; Rios Calvet, Jaume; Rabella Vives, Josep Maria (1989). Guia de Catalunya, Barcelona: Caixa de Catalunya.  (Spanish).  (Catalan).

External links
 Government data pages 

Municipalities in Alt Urgell
Populated places in Alt Urgell